Eric Austen (3 November 1922 – 1 July 1999) was an English designer and teacher, and played a part in the creation of the well-known ND symbol, as used, among others, by the Campaign for Nuclear Disarmament (CND).

He grew up in the Norfolk village of Hethersett, and described his childhood in his 1996 book All that I was : a village childhood in the thirties, which has a foreword by Richard Hoggart.  He attended Hethersett British School and then City of Norwich School, a grammar school to which he won a scholarship.

During the Second World War Austen, who was a pacifist, was exempted from military service as a conscientious objector, and worked for the Forestry Commission. After the war he taught in primary school, then studied at the University of London, Institute of Education while teaching at Southlands College (1964–1972).

He taught at Goldsmiths, University of London from 1972, specialising in art education, and was promoted to Senior Lecturer. He held a 1981 exhibition of 40 giant "Life Books" which held more than 2000 quotations from the world's literature and philosophy. This exhibition was revived in 1990 at Friends House in London.

The CND acknowledges Austen as the maker of the first ND badges, but attributes the design of the symbol to Gerald Holtom. These earliest badges were made in ceramic (fireclay) – which Austen noted would mean they could be among the very few man-made objects to survive a nuclear inferno. Austen is quoted as saying of the design: "the gesture of despair had long been associated with the death of Man and the circle with the unborn child."  In 2017 Austen's daughter Gea launched online petitions at change.org and 38 Degrees, addressed to the CND, Jeremy Corbyn (leader of the Labour Party) and Kate Hudson (General secretary of CND), asking that her father should be recognised as having designed the CND symbol.

Austen was married three times, to Nina Carmela, Audrey Whiting and Kate Taylor and when he died of leukemia on 1 July 1999 he left a daughter Gea (by Audrey Whiting) and two grandsons.

References

External links
Photo of Austen with his daughter and second wife
Photo of Austen's original 1958 ceramic CND badge

Academics of Goldsmiths, University of London
Academics of the University of Roehampton
English designers
English conscientious objectors
1922 births
1999 deaths
Deaths from leukemia
Deaths from cancer in England